The Conduit is the eighth studio album by the rock artist Jarboe. It was released in 2005 on Atavistic Records.

Track listing

Personnel
Adapted from The Conduit liner notes.
Musicians
 Jarboe – lead vocals, piano, organ, engineering, mixing
 Nic Le Ban – guitar
Production and additional personnel
 Chris Griffin – mastering

Release history

References 

2005 albums
Jarboe albums
Atavistic Records albums